Stertinius is a genus of Asian jumping spiders that was first described by Eugène Louis Simon in 1890.

Species
 it contains twelve species, found only in Asia:
Stertinius borneensis Logunov, 2018 – Malaysia (Borneo)
Stertinius capucinus Simon, 1902 – Indonesia (Java)
Stertinius cyprius Merian, 1911 – Indonesia (Sulawesi)
Stertinius dentichelis Simon, 1890 (type) – Mariana Is.
Stertinius kumadai Logunov, Ikeda & Ono, 1997 – Japan
Stertinius magnificus Merian, 1911 – Indonesia (Sulawesi)
Stertinius niger Merian, 1911 – Indonesia (Sulawesi)
Stertinius nobilis (Thorell, 1890) – Indonesia (Sulawesi)
Stertinius onoi Prószyński & Deeleman-Reinhold, 2013 – Borneo
Stertinius patellaris Simon, 1902 – Indonesia (Moluccas)
Stertinius pilipes Simon, 1902 – Philippines
Stertinius splendens Simon, 1902 – Indonesia (Sulawesi)

References

Salticidae genera
Salticidae
Spiders of Asia